The Point of Ayr Colliery Company was formed in 1883, and was the third company to attempt to extract coal from the North Wales Coalfield using a pit head at Point of Ayr, in Flintshire, Wales. The two previous attempts were carried out by the Prestatyn Coal Company, 1865, under the direction of Lord Mostyn, owner of the nearby Mostyn Colliery, and the Western Mostyn Colliery Company, 1873.

This new company made use of a shaft sunk in 1873, which had been abandoned because the heading driven out from that shaft had struck a fault. The Point of Ayr Colliery Company decided to strike out in another direction, where they struck a seam in 1890.

According to contemporary figures from the Inspector of Mines, by 1896 356 men were employed by the company, which produced coal for domestic and industrial applications.

The British coal industry was nationalised in 1947.

References

Flintshire
Coal companies of Wales
Defunct companies of Wales
Energy companies established in 1883
British companies established in 1883
1883 establishments in Wales